The following highways are numbered 427:

Canada
Manitoba Provincial Road 427
 Ontario Highway 427

India
National Highway 427 (India)

Japan
 Japan National Route 427

United States
  County Road 427 (Seminole County, Florida)
  Indiana State Road 427
  County Road 427 (DeKalb County, Indiana)
  Nevada State Route 427
  New York State Route 427
 New York State Route 427 (former)
  Pennsylvania Route 427
  Puerto Rico Highway 427
  Texas State Highway Loop 427 (former)